Augustin is an unincorporated community in Perry County, Alabama, United States. A post office operated under the name Augustin from 1883 to 1943. Geologist George Perkins Merrill described a meteorite held in the National Museum of Natural History that was found in a field in Augustin.

Demographics
According to the returns from 1850-2010 for Alabama, it has never reported a population figure separately on the U.S. Census.

References

Unincorporated communities in Perry County, Alabama
Unincorporated communities in Alabama